Michael Mamleev (also known as Mikhail Mamlejev, born 4 September 1975) is an ex-Russian orienteering competitor and sky runner, naturalised Italian and European champion.

Results for Russia
He received a gold medal in the middle distance at the 2002 European Orienteering Championships. He was member of the Russian team that received a silver medal in the relay at the 2004 World Orienteering Championships in Västerås, Sweden.

Italian citizenship
Mamleev is Italian now. In spring of 2004 he married Sabine Rottensteiner from Italy and moved to this country to live there permanently. Right from the start he was clear about his intentions of getting Italian citizenship, in which he was also strongly supported by the Italian Orienteering Federation. In July 2006, this mission was brought to a successful end and Mamleev got the Italian passport just in time to be able to take part at the World Championships in Denmark in August 2006.

Results for Italy
World championships 2006: Competing for Italy he finished 12th in the long distance. and 8th in the middle distance. 13th with the Italian relay team.
World championships 2007: 8th in the long distance. 8th in the sprint. 12th in the relay event with the Italian team.
World championships 2009: First Italian medal on World Orienteering Championships: 3rd in the long distance.

National titles
Italian Skyrunning Championships 
SkyRace: 2011

References

External links

1978 births
Living people
Russian orienteers
Italian orienteers
Male orienteers
Foot orienteers
World Orienteering Championships medalists
Italian male mountain runners
Italian sky runners
Junior World Orienteering Championships medalists